"What's in the Box" is episode 144 of the American television anthology series The Twilight Zone. It originally aired on March 13, 1964 on CBS. In this episode, a man's television set displays his past, present, and future, revealing to him that he will kill his wife.

Opening narration

Plot
Joe and Phyllis Britt are an old married couple in New York City who do not get along. Joe gets home from his job as a cab driver late one night, and Phyllis accuses him of seeing another woman. In the meantime, a television repairman is in the next room fixing their broken set. Irritated, Joe harasses the repairman about the inconvenience and cost. The repairman abruptly closes the open TV panel and announces the TV is fixed. After stating the job is free, he leaves, and the TV starts getting channel 10—a station showing the past, present, and future of Joe and Phyllis' lives. Joe refuses to let Phyllis watch the TV and faints when he sees himself and a mistress talking.

When he tunes in again later, it shows him killing Phyllis in a fight. Joe breaks down at the sight and tells Phyllis what is happening. Phyllis seeks help from the family doctor, who gives Joe a sedative and says that seeing oneself on television is one of several common delusions manifested by the struggle to adjust to the new technology of television.

Profoundly disturbed by the sight of Phyllis' death, Joe tries to heal their relationship, telling her that he accepts the blame for their feuding and has realized that his extramarital affairs were only an escape from the stress of his job, that Phyllis is still the one he really loves. Embittered by years of Joe's coldness and philandering, Phyllis scorns his attempt at reconciliation. When he begins reacting to another channel 10 vision – his trial and execution for Phyllis's murder via electric chair – even as Phyllis sees only static, Phyllis is convinced that Joe has lost his mind and taunts him. Joe, angered, attacks and kills her in the same manner as he had seen on the television screen.

As Joe is arrested by the police, the TV repairman suddenly appears and mockingly asks, "Fix your set okay, Mister? You will recommend my service, won't you?" The repairman smirks as Joe is taken away.

Closing narration

Cast
 Joan Blondell as Phyllis Britt
 William Demarest as Joe Britt
 Sterling Holloway as TV Repairman
 Herbert Lytton as Dr. Saltman
 Sandra Gould as Woman On T.V.
 Howard Wright as Judge
 Douglas Bank as Prosecutor
 Ted Christy as The Wild Panther
 Robert McCord as Electric Chair Guard
 Tony Miller as Announcer
 Mitchell Rhein as Neighbour
 Rod Serling as Host / Narrator – Himself 
 Ron Stokes as Car Salesman
 John L. Sullivan as The Russian Duke

References
DeVoe, Bill. (2008). Trivia from The Twilight Zone. Albany, Ga.: Bear Manor Media. 
Grams, Martin. (2008). The Twilight Zone: Unlocking the Door to a Television Classic. Churchville, Md.: OTR Publishing.

External links

1964 American television episodes
The Twilight Zone (1959 TV series season 5) episodes